Strongsville High School is a public high school located in Strongsville, Ohio, United States. The current principal is Bill Wingler.

The school colors are forest green and white. The mascot is the Mustang. The school was a member of the Pioneer Conference but moved to the Northeast Ohio Conference at the conclusion of the 2006–07 school year.  The fight song is to the tune of "On Wisconsin".

Academic standards
Strongsville High is designated an Ohio School of Excellence with Distinction.<ref>"Strongsville High School", Strongsville City Schools, accessed December 21, 2007</ref>

Activities

UNICEF Club
The Strongsville High School UNICEF Club upholds the values of UNICEF through educating, advocating and fundraising.

Key Club
The Strongsville Key Club, chartered in 1999, is a member of the Kiwanis International service-leadership program for high school students: Key Club International.  Through Key Club, members learn leadership by the core values, which are centered around serving others.

The Marching Mustangs
Strongsville's marching band, the "Marching Mustangs," has participated in the Hollywood Christmas Parade, the Orange Bowl Parade, the Tournament of Roses Parade, the Macy's Thanksgiving Day Parade, and in the Inauguration Parade for President George H. W. Bush.

Language Clubs
 The German Club holds parties on German holidays, school-wide German trivia contests, and informs students about German culture and cultural traditions. It also supports the school's chapter of the German National Honor Society, Delta Epsilon Phi, or Deutsche Ehrenverbindung''.
 The French club meets weekly, celebrates French holidays and informs students about French culture and cultural traditions.

Athletics

Stadium
In late 2002 the school converted a rough field behind the school to a state-of-the-art 5,200 seat football stadium in just 84 days. The $1.85 million stadium was entirely privately financed. The name of the stadium is Pat Catan Stadium. The previous location of the high school football field was at Center Middle School (demolished in 2016) . The stadium was featured on national television when the Mustangs took on the Glenville Tarblooders in 2006. Returfed for games in 2016.

Championships
Ohio High School Athletic Association Division I State Championships:
 Baseball – 2006 
 Boys Soccer – 1997
 Girls Soccer – 1998, 2002, 2005, 2011

State records
Tim Arthurs holds the Ohio High School Athletic Association Record for highest completion percentage among Ohio high school quarterbacks in a single season, with 72.5% in 1998.

Arson 
In the early morning of January 29, 1996, a fire was started in the offices at the center of the school.  Police identified the propellant as gasoline and believe those responsible targeted the paper records held in the administrative offices.  The investigation noted a window in a classroom that was either left open or unlocked.  The investigation remains unsolved despite a $10,000 reward and hundreds of tips after the fire. Damage to the building totaled $1.4 million.

Allegations of negligence
In February 2006 a former Strongsville High student sued the school district and the police department claiming that they did nothing to stop an affair he had with a female teacher, Christine Scarlett, while he was a student at the school.

Christine Scarlett was a substitute special education teacher hired by Strongsville High School. In 2002 Scarlett began a program to encourage her students to improve their grades called “raise your grade – date a teacher”.  In November of that year Scarlett announced the winner of the contest was a male student with learning disabilities on the football team.  A 2 year sexual relationship resulting in the birth of a child began between Scarlett then 36, and the student aged 17.

In January 2006, the student now 20 years old, sued Scarlett for custody of their 3-year-old son exposing the relationship to public scrutiny.

In May 2007 Christine Scarlett pleaded guilty to sexual assault and battery in Cuyahoga County Common Pleas Court.  She received a sentence of three days in county jail, followed by 180 days’ house arrest and five years’ probation.

The lawsuit filed by the former student against Strongsville City Schools claimed the school system enabled Scarlett to conduct the “raise your grade – date a teacher” curriculum which resulted in the assault and sexual battery against the “handicapped child”.   The Ohio 8th District Court of Appeals determined that the action against the school system for failing to protect the child was outside of the statute of limitations.

In January 2008, Strongsville Police accused school officials of hindering a criminal investigation by failing to promptly report allegations that another teacher had a sexual relationship with a student. After receiving an anonymous tip in November 2007, school officials investigated and determined the allegations not credible.

April 29, 2008 a Cuyahoga County grand jury charged 32-year-old social studies teacher John Bacho with five counts of sexual battery and possession of a criminal tool.

John Bacho was found guilty of two counts of sexual battery on July 16, 2009.  He was sentenced to three years in prison.

Teachers union strike 
On March 4, 2013 members of the Strongsville Education Associate (SEA) picketed outside the building after contract negotions failed regarding healthcare costs and salaries had not been increased for 7 years. The Strongsville City Schools 2013 Teacher Strike lasted for eight weeks concluding with agreed upon contracts April 27, 2013.

Notable alumni
 Jim Goetz, venture capitalist
 Mark Hunter, musician, photographer
 Marwan Maalouf, coach in the National Football League
 Shawn Mennenga, coach in the National Football League
 Lorin Morgan-Richards, author and illustrator
 Tucker Neale, basketball player
 Matt Warburton, screenwriter for The Simpsons, Community, and The Mindy Project
 Aaron White, professional basketball player
 D. J. Woods, professional football player

References

External links
 Official site
 Strongsville Instrumental Music Boosters

High schools in Cuyahoga County, Ohio
Educational institutions established in 1968
Public high schools in Ohio
Strongsville, Ohio